George Minshull Sessford (7 November 1928 - 21 July 1996) was  Bishop of Moray, Ross and Caithness in the second half of the 20th century.

Biography
George was born in Aintree and educated at St Andrews University. After a period of study at Lincoln Theological College, he was ordained in 1954. His first posts were as curate at St Mary's Cathedral, Glasgow and chaplain of the city's university. He was Priest in charge of Cumbernauld New Town from 1958 to 1966 and Rector of Forres until his elevation to the episcopate. He is survived by three daughters, four grandchildren and three great grandchildren.

Notes

1928 births
People from Aintree
Alumni of the University of St Andrews
20th-century Scottish Episcopalian bishops
Bishops of Moray, Ross and Caithness
1996 deaths
Clergy from Liverpool